Lorenzo "Renzo" Gazzari (7 January 1907 in Hvar – 1998 in Florence) was an Italian footballer who played as a defender.

Career
Gazzari played a total of 152 matches for HNK Hajduk Split between 1921 and 1928, 10 of which came in the Yugoslav Championship, and helped the club win its first national championship in 1927. Next, he will move, along his brother Otmar to Trieste to play for U.S. Triestina Calcio where he'll be spotted by the AC Fiorentina´s scouts. He will continue his career in Florence where he will make an astonishing career becoming one of the most influential defenders of the club in the 1930s, and having capped three times for the Italian B national team. He was mostly known as left full-back, playing equally well with both of his legs. After ending his playing career, he dedicated to tennis, having become a tennis coach.

Lorenzo Gazzari played three games for the Italian B national team, all in 1932.

References

External sources

 Stats from Italy at enciclopediadelcalcio.it
 Profile at Nogometni Leksikon. 
 Profile at MyJuve
 Lorenzo Gazzari at ATF-Firenze.it

1907 births
1998 deaths
Italian footballers
HNK Hajduk Split players
U.S. Triestina Calcio 1918 players
ACF Fiorentina players
Serie A players
Casale F.B.C. players
Association football defenders
Expatriate footballers in Yugoslavia
Yugoslav First League players